Joy-Anna Forsyth (née Duggar; born October 28, 1997) is an American television personality. She is known for her appearances on TLC as part of the reality television shows 19 Kids and Counting (2008–2015) and Jill & Jessa: Counting On (2015–2021).

Personal life
Forsyth is the fifth daughter born to Jim Bob Duggar and Michelle (Ruark) Duggar, and the ninth of 19 children. She met Austin Forsyth at a homeschooling conference as a child. The couple married on May 26, 2017. They have two children, Gideon Martyn and Evelyn Mae.

References

External links 

Living people
1997 births
Duggar family
Baptists from Arkansas
People from Washington County, Arkansas